FSF may refer to:

Organizations 
 Free Software Foundation, an American non-profit organization with a mission to promote computer user freedom
 Federal Security Force (Pakistan)
 Federación de Sindicatos Ferroviarios, a defunct Argentine trade union
 Financial Stability Forum, a defunct international organization of financial regulators
 Flight Safety Foundation, an international independent, non-profit organization for research, education, and communications in the field of civil aviation flight safety
 Föreningen Sveriges Filmfotografer, the Swedish Society of Cinematographers
 Progressive Party, an Icelandic political party (in Icelandic: Framsóknarflokkurinn)

Arts and entertainment 
 Folsom Street Fair
 Further Seems Forever, a rock band
 Fugitive Strike Force, a 2006 television series
 The Magazine of Fantasy & Science Fiction, also abbreviated F&SF
 Speculative fiction (genre) containing the subgenre of fantasy/science fiction (F/SF)
 Science fantasy (genre), a mixed genre of fantasy and science fiction elements

Sports 
 Faroe Islands Football Association
 Federação Sergipana de Futebol, the Football Federation of Sergipe, Brazil
 Football Supporters' Federation
 Fuerte San Francisco, a Salvadoran football club
 Sahrawi Football Federation
 São Toméan Football Federation
 Senegalese Footrrball Federation

Other uses 
 Familial Shar Pei fever
 Fibrin-stabilizing factor
 Flexible Support Fund in the United Kingdom
 Folsom Street Fair, in San Francisco, California, United States
 Fourth suit forcing, a bidding convention in the game of contract bridge
 Free speech fights, a series of 20th-century labor-related conflicts in the United States
 Full state feedback